This is the list of airports in Serbia, grouped by type and sorted by location.

Airports statistics
Airports with number of passengers served per year:

List of airports in Serbia

 

Airport names shown in bold indicate the airport has scheduled service with commercial airlines:

See also

 Airports of Serbia
 Transport in Serbia
 AirSerbia

References

References:

 Map of airports in Serbia with asphalt - concrete runways
 AERODROMI u PDF formatu

 
Serbia
Airports
Airports
Serbia